Girvan Community Hospital is a health facility in Girvan, South Ayrshire, Scotland. It is managed by NHS Ayrshire and Arran.

History 
The facility was commissioned to replace the aging Davidson Hospital. The building, which was designed by Austin-Smith:Lord and built by Barr Construction at a cost £15.2 million, was completed in March 2010.

References 

Hospitals in South Ayrshire
NHS Ayrshire and Arran
NHS Scotland hospitals
Hospital buildings completed in 2010
Hospitals established in 2010
2010 establishments in Scotland
Girvan